Strathkanaird (also Strathcanaird) is a remote crofting township around seven miles north of Ullapool, in western Ross-shire, Scottish Highlands and is in the Scottish council area of Highland.

References

Populated places in Ross and Cromarty